Vatan Huseynli is an Azerbaijani boxer. At the 2012 Summer Olympics, he competed in the Men's light heavyweight, but was defeated in the first round. According to BBC, Huseynli was 1.85m tall and weighed 81 kg as of August 13, 2012.

References

Azerbaijani male boxers
Year of birth missing (living people)
Living people
Olympic boxers of Azerbaijan
Boxers at the 2012 Summer Olympics
Light-heavyweight boxers
21st-century Azerbaijani people